Juris is mostly a Latvian masculine given name derived from the Greek Γεώργιος (Georgios), meaning "farmer", and may refer to:

 Juris Alunāns (1832–1864), Latvian writer and philologist 
 Juris Bārzdiņš (born 1966), Latvian politician
 Juris Bērziņš (born 1954), Latvian rower and Olympic competitor
 Juris Binde (born 1955), Latvian businessman
 Juris Cibuļs (born 1951), Latvian publicist, humanist, linguist and translator
 Juris Dalbiņš (born 1954), Latvian politician
 Juris Ekmanis (born 1941), Latvian scientist and academic
 Juris Fernandez (born 1978), Filipino singer
 Juris Hartmanis (born 1928), Latvian scientist
 Juris Kalniņš (1938–2010), Latvian basketball player and Olympic medalist 
 Juris Kronbergs (born 1946), Latvian-Swedish poet
 Juris Laizāns (born 1979), Latvian footballer
 Juris Lauciņš (1957–2013), Latvian actor
 Juris Markauss (born 1943), Latvian chess player 
 Juris Māters (1845–1885), Latvian writer
 Juris Podnieks (1950–1992), Latvian film director
 Juris Rubenis (born 1961), Latvian Lutheran pastor
 Juris Šics (born 1983), Latvian luger and Olympic medalist
 Juris Silovs (born 1973), Latvian racing cyclist
 Juris Silovs (born 1950), Latvian sprinter and Olympic medalist
 Juris Sokolovskis (born 1976), Latvian lawyer
 Juris Štāls (born 1982), Latvian ice-hockey player
 Juris Strenga (born 1937), Latvian actor
 Juris Tone (born 1961), Latvian bobsledder and Olympic medalist
 Juris Upītis (born 1991), Latvian ice hockey player
 Juris Upatnieks (born 1936), Latvian-born American physicist, inventor and pioneer in the field of holography
 Juris Zariņš (born 1945), American archaeologist

Stage name
 Vic Juris (born Victor Edward Jurusz Jr.; 1953–2019), American guitarist

Latvian masculine given names